Kang Hyun-su (born June 16, 1984) is a North Korean football player.

Club statistics

References

External links

Entry at j-league.or.jp 

1984 births
Living people
Momoyama Gakuin University alumni
Association football people from Osaka Prefecture
Sportspeople from Osaka
North Korean footballers
J2 League players
Japan Football League players
Kyoto Sanga FC players
Kataller Toyama players
SP Kyoto FC players
Association football midfielders